Te Ara Ahunga Ora Retirement Commission (formerly Commission for Financial Capability), is a Crown entity under the New Zealand Crown Entities Act 2004. The Commission provides financial education and information to residents of New Zealand, advises government on retirement income policy, and monitors the effectiveness of the Retirement Villages Act 2003.

Overview
Te Ara Ahunga Ora Retirement Commission operates under the NZ Superannuation and Retirement Income Act, which provides the statutory framework for its operations. It also has certain functions under the Retirement Villages Act 2003. The commission is funded by central government and has an annual budget of around $NZ8.6m.

The commission's activities include:

 Review of Retirement Income Policy - completed every three years to assess effectiveness, identify future issues, provide policy stability and inform policy development
 Sorted - providing free independent and financial impartial information and tools
 Money Week - New Zealand's annual, nationwide financial capability week is held in August.
 Research on New Zealanders' financial capability and retirement income  
 Monitoring the retirement village regulatory framework

Retirement Commissioner
Te Ara Ahunga Ora Retirement Commission is the office of the Retirement Commissioner, Jane Wrightson. She was appointed by the Minister of Commerce for a three-year term from February 2020. Wrightson was formerly Chief Executive of NZ on Air.

Previous Retirement Commissioners are:

 Diane Maxwell (2013-2019)
 Diana Crossan (2002-2013)
 Colin Blair (1995-2001)

See also
 New Zealand Superannuation Fund

References

External links
Official website
Sorted website
Money Week website
The Exchange website
Smart Investor

New Zealand autonomous Crown entities